The Lobito–Dar es Salaam Railway is a planned narrow gauge railway line that connects the Angolan port city of Lobito to the Tanzanian port city of Dar es Salaam, through the Zambian city of Kapiri Mposhi. It is an African transcontinental railroad connecting the Atlantic and Indian oceans and it is financed by China.

Location

From Lobito, the line would travel eastwards, cross into Zambia, to the city of Kapiri Mposhi, an estimated  from Lobito. From there, the railway line would continue eastwards towards the Indian Ocean coast, as the existing Tazara Railway that measures , whose eastern terminus is the port of Dar es Salaam in Tanzania.

Overview
The justification for this railway line is to promote exports of the three countries, through which the railway passes, to the continents of Europe, the Americas and Asia. The line would also increase tourism into those three countries, in addition to creating jobs and improving local economies.

The railway link would also allow the distribution of imported goods from overseas into the three African countries, as well as promote intra-African trade, among those countries.

Way forward
The government of Angola is prepared to spearhead the efforts to build the Lobito-Kapiri Mposhi section of the railway line and is looking upon Zambia and Tanzania to harmonize the integration of the new construction with the existing Tazara Railway. No timelines have been made public, as of December 2020.

See also

 History of rail transport in Angola
 Rail transport in Angola
 TAZARA

References

External links
 Plans to build Angola-Tanzania trans-African railway pick up pace As of 3 December 2020.

Railway lines in Angola
Railway lines in Zambia
Railway lines in Tanzania
International railway lines
3 ft 6 in gauge railways in Angola
3 ft 6 in gauge railways in Tanzania
3 ft 6 in gauge railways in Zambia
Proposed rail infrastructure